Kanti Prasad Bajpai (born 1955) is an Indian academic, international affairs analyst, and the former headmaster of The Doon School, Dehradun, India. He is known to be an expert on Indo-China relations. He is currently a professor at National University of Singapore and was the Vice-Dean for Research of the Lee Kuan Yew School of Public Policy. Bajpai also writes a monthly column for The Times of India.

Early life and education
Kanti Prasad Bajpai comes from a family of Indian diplomats: his father, Uma Shankar Bajpai was a former Indian High Commissioner to Canada; an uncle, K.S. Bajpai was a former Ambassador to United States; and his grandfather, Sir Girija Shankar Bajpai, was Agent-General for India in the United States prior to India gaining independence.

Bajpai, like most of his family before him, completed his schooling at The Doon School, where he also edited The Doon School Weekly. After leaving Doon in 1972, Bajpai obtained his Bachelor of Arts in Economics and Master of Arts in political science from the University of British Columbia in British Columbia, Canada, and returned to Doon and taught there in 1981. Bajpai went to North America to earn his PhD in Political Science from the University of Illinois in 1982.

Career
Bajpai returned to India in 1989 and taught at Maharaja Sayajirao University of Baroda for three years, he went back to America to teach at Wesleyan University. In 1993 he returned again to India to the Institute of Contemporary Studies of the Rajiv Gandhi Foundation. In 1994 he joined Jawaharlal Nehru University as professor of international studies. In 2000, he was a visiting professor at University of Notre Dame in South Bend, Indiana. He also worked as a researcher at the Brookings Institution in Washington, D.C. the same year.

In June 2003, Bajpai was appointed the eighth Headmaster of The Doon School.  During his tenure at Doon, he was instrumental in modernizing the facilities.

After completing his tenure as Headmaster in 2009, Bajpai left Doon to join the School of Inter Disciplinary Area studies, Wolfson College, Oxford. After a short stint at Oxford, he joined the Lee Kuan Yew School of Public Policy at National University of Singapore as a Senior Professor.

Publications
 South Asia after the Cold War: international perspectives, by Kanti P. Bajpai, Stephen P. Cohen, Program in Arms Control, Disarmament and International Security. Westview Press, 1993. .
 Interpreting world politics: essays for A.P. Rana, by A. P. Rana, Kanti P. Bajpai, H. C. Shukul. Sage Publications, 1995. .
 International Relations in India: Theorising the region and nation, by Kanti P. Bajpai, Siddharth Mallavarapu. Orient Blackswan, 2005. . Excerpts
 International Relations in India: Bringing theory back home, by Kanti P. Bajpai, Siddharth Mallavarapu. Orient Blackswan, 2005. .
 "Chapter 2 – Pakistan's Future: Muddle Along (Book: The Future of Pakistan by Stephen P.Cohen & Others, 2011). 
India Versus China: Why They Are Not Friends. June 2021. Kanti Bajpai. Juggernaut.

Awards
 K Subrahmanyam Award – Award for Excellence in research and strategic security issues.

References

External links
 Kanti Bajpai NUS Profile
 Kanti Bajpai columns The Times of India

Academic staff of Jawaharlal Nehru University
The Doon School faculty
The Doon School alumni
Headmasters of The Doon School
Living people
University of British Columbia alumni
University of Illinois Urbana-Champaign alumni
Indian columnists
International relations scholars
Indian political scientists
Academic staff of Maharaja Sayajirao University of Baroda
Wesleyan University faculty
Journalists from Uttarakhand
1955 births